Jenny Marie Egnot (born 4 November 1968 in Oklahoma City, Oklahoma) is a New Zealand yachtswoman.

She competed for New Zealand in sailing at the 2000 Summer Olympics in Sydney, with Melinda Henshaw in the Women's Double Handed Dinghy (470) class.

She is the sister of Leslie Egnot who represented New Zealand, also in the 470 class, at three previous Olympics.

References

External links 
 
 
 
 

1968 births
Living people
New Zealand female sailors (sport)
Sailors at the 2000 Summer Olympics – 470
Olympic sailors of New Zealand
New Zealand people of American descent
Sportspeople from Oklahoma City